The Protection of Wages Convention, 1949 is  an International Labour Organization (ILO) Convention.

It was established in 1949, with the preamble stating:
Having decided upon the adoption of certain proposals concerning the protection of wages,...

This convention is referred to in the preamble to the Abolition of Forced Labour Convention of 1957.

Modification 
The convention was subsequently revised by Convention C173, Protection of Workers' Claims (Employer's Insolvency) Convention, 1992.

Ratifications
As of 2021, the convention had been ratified by 99 states. Subsequent to ratification, one state, the United Kingdom, renounced the treaty on 16 September 1983.

References

External links 
Text.
Ratifications.

Wages and salaries
International Labour Organization conventions
Treaties concluded in 1949
Treaties entered into force in 1952
Treaties of the Kingdom of Afghanistan
Treaties of Albania
Treaties of Algeria
Treaties of Argentina
Treaties of Armenia
Treaties of Austria
Treaties of Azerbaijan
Treaties of the Bahamas
Treaties of Barbados
Treaties of the Byelorussian Soviet Socialist Republic
Treaties of Belgium
Treaties of Belize
Treaties of the Republic of Dahomey
Treaties of Bolivia
Treaties of the Second Brazilian Republic
Treaties of Botswana
Treaties of Burkina Faso
Treaties of the People's Republic of Bulgaria
Treaties of Cameroon
Treaties of the Central African Republic
Treaties of Chad
Treaties of Colombia
Treaties of the Comoros
Treaties of the Republic of the Congo
Treaties of Costa Rica
Treaties of Cuba
Treaties of Cyprus
Treaties of Czechoslovakia
Treaties of the Czech Republic
Treaties of Ivory Coast
Treaties of the Democratic Republic of the Congo (1964–1971)
Treaties of Djibouti
Treaties of Dominica
Treaties of the Dominican Republic
Treaties of Ecuador
Treaties of the United Arab Republic
Treaties of the French Fourth Republic
Treaties of Gabon
Treaties of the Kingdom of Greece
Treaties of Grenada
Treaties of Guatemala
Treaties of Guinea
Treaties of Guyana
Treaties of Honduras
Treaties of the Hungarian People's Republic
Treaties of Pahlavi Iran
Treaties of the Iraqi Republic (1958–1968)
Treaties of Israel
Treaties of Italy
Treaties of Kazakhstan
Treaties of Kyrgyzstan
Treaties of Lebanon
Treaties of the Kingdom of Libya
Treaties of Madagascar
Treaties of the Federation of Malaya
Treaties of Mali
Treaties of Mauritania
Treaties of Mauritius
Treaties of Mexico
Treaties of Moldova
Treaties of the Netherlands
Treaties of Nicaragua
Treaties of Niger
Treaties of Nigeria
Treaties of Norway
Treaties of Panama
Treaties of Paraguay
Treaties of the Philippines
Treaties of the Polish People's Republic
Treaties of Portugal
Treaties of the Socialist Republic of Romania
Treaties of the Soviet Union
Treaties of Saint Lucia
Treaties of Senegal
Treaties of Sierra Leone
Treaties of Slovakia
Treaties of Slovenia
Treaties of the Solomon Islands
Treaties of Francoist Spain
Treaties of the Somali Republic
Treaties of Saudi Arabia
Treaties of Sri Lanka
Treaties of Suriname
Treaties of the Democratic Republic of the Sudan
Treaties of Eswatini
Treaties of the Syrian Republic (1930–1963)
Treaties of Tajikistan
Treaties of Tanganyika
Treaties of Togo
Treaties of Tunisia
Treaties of Turkey
Treaties of Uganda
Treaties of the Ukrainian Soviet Socialist Republic
Treaties of Uruguay
Treaties of Venezuela
Treaties of South Yemen
Treaties of Zambia
Treaties of Saint Vincent and the Grenadines
Treaties of Malta
Treaties extended to French Comoros
Treaties extended to French Somaliland
Treaties extended to French Guiana
Treaties extended to French Polynesia
Treaties extended to Guadeloupe
Treaties extended to Martinique
Treaties extended to Réunion
Treaties extended to New Caledonia
Treaties extended to Saint Pierre and Miquelon
Treaties extended to Netherlands New Guinea
Treaties extended to the Colony of Aden
Treaties extended to the Colony of the Bahamas
Treaties extended to the West Indies Federation
Treaties extended to British Honduras
Treaties extended to the Bechuanaland Protectorate
Treaties extended to the Colony of North Borneo
Treaties extended to British Somaliland
Treaties extended to Brunei (protectorate)
Treaties extended to British Cyprus
Treaties extended to Gibraltar
Treaties extended to British Guiana
Treaties extended to Jersey
Treaties extended to British Kenya
Treaties extended to the Crown Colony of Malta
Treaties extended to the Isle of Man
Treaties extended to British Mauritius
Treaties extended to the Colony and Protectorate of Nigeria
Treaties extended to the Colony of Sarawak
Treaties extended to the Colony of Sierra Leone
Treaties extended to the British Solomon Islands
Treaties extended to Tanganyika (territory)
Treaties extended to the Uganda Protectorate
Treaties extended to the Sultanate of Zanzibar
Treaties extended to the Aden Protectorate
1949 in labor relations